Duncan Welbourne (28 July 1940 – 14 January 2019) was an English professional football player, coach and manager.

Early life 
Born in Scunthorpe, Lincolnshire, he began his career as an amateur at Scunthorpe United. He started his professional career at Grimsby, as a wing half. In November 1963 he transferred to Watford, for a fee of £1,300. At Watford he converted to a full back, when the club started playing in a 4–4–2 formation. Welbourne set what was then a Watford record of 457 competitive appearances, breaking the 35-year-old record previously held by Tommy Barnett. His 280 consecutive Football League games remains a record. After finishing third in the club's inaugural Player of the Season award in 1972–73, Welbourne left Watford  on a free transfer at the end of the 1973–74 season. He joined Southport, where he finished his playing career. He also took on a coaching role, and managed the team between September 1975 and January 1976.

Welbourne died on the morning of 14 January 2019, as confirmed by Watford 

He won a Division Three championship medal; a fourth-place FA Cup medal but his most treasured possession was a testimonial present of a gold disc awarded for the song Goodbye Yellow Brick Road, presented by Elton John, then director, with the inscription: "To Duncan: something to keep you close to Watfordand myself."

References 

1940 births
2019 deaths
Scunthorpe United F.C. players
Grimsby Town F.C. players
Watford F.C. players
Southport F.C. players
Southport F.C. managers
English Football League players
Sportspeople from Scunthorpe
Association football fullbacks
English footballers
English football managers